The Allen Kingston was an American automobile manufactured by the New York Car & Truck Company for motor agent Walter C. Allen of New York City.  The car was designed on European lines, featuring runningboard-mounted spare tires and an early boat-tailed body, but was meant for American manufacture to circumvent the 45% duty on imported cars.  These 45 hp 7400 cc cars were advertised as combining "the best features of the Fiat, the Renault and the Mercedes in a harmonious new construction of the highest quality".  They were only in production for two years, from 1907 to 1909.

Brass Era vehicles
Defunct motor vehicle manufacturers of the United States
Motor vehicle manufacturers based in New York (state)
Defunct companies based in New York (state)
Vehicle manufacturing companies established in 1907
Vehicle manufacturing companies disestablished in 1909
1907 establishments in New York City
1909 disestablishments in New York (state)